Sorkheh (also Romanized as Sarāy, Serar, and Seraz) is a village in Koshksaray Rural District, in the Central District of Marand County, East Azerbaijan Province, Iran. At the 2006 census, its population was 376, in 90 families.

References 

Populated places in Marand County